Tropidolaemus subannulatus is a venomous pit viper species native to Brunei, Indonesia, Malaysia, and the Philippines.

Common names: Bornean keeled green pit viper, North Philippine temple pit viper

References

Reptiles described in 2007
Crotalinae